Johnstonella angustifolia is a species of wildflower in the borage family known by several common names, including Panamint catseye and bristlelobe cryptantha. This plant is native to northern Mexico and the southwestern United States from California to Texas, where it grows in desert scrub and woodland.

Description
Johnstonella angustifolia is an annual herb usually under half a meter in height and covered in long hairs and bristles. It has a number of small linear leaves mostly toward the base of the plant. The erect stems are covered by inflorescences in a cane-shaped curl similar to the flowers of fiddlenecks. Each flower is white with yellow throat parts and a few millimeters wide.

References

External links
 Calflora Database: Cryptantha angustifolia (Panamint cryptantha)
Jepson Manual Treatment - Cryptantha angustifolia
UC CalPhotos gallery of Cryptantha angustifolia (Panamint cryptantha)

Boraginaceae
North American desert flora
Flora of the California desert regions
Flora of Northwestern Mexico
Flora of the Southwestern United States
Flora of the South-Central United States
Flora of the Chihuahuan Desert
Flora of the Sonoran Deserts
Natural history of the Colorado Desert
Natural history of the Mojave Desert